This page is a list of 2014 UCI ProTeams and riders. These teams competed in the 2014 UCI World Tour.

Teams overview 
The 18 ProTeams in 2014 were:

Riders





































Notes

References

See also 

 2014 in men's road cycling
 List of 2014 UCI Professional Continental and Continental teams
 List of 2014 UCI Women's Teams

2014 in men's road cycling
2014